Olga Levina may refer to:

 Olga Levina (draughts player), Soviet, then Ukrainian, international draughts player
 Olga Levina (handballer), Russian handball player